Antonio Vittorioso (born 9 January 1973) is an Italian water polo player. He competed in the men's tournament at the 2000 Summer Olympics.

References

1973 births
Living people
Italian male water polo players
Olympic water polo players of Italy
Water polo players at the 2000 Summer Olympics
Water polo players from Rome